William Posey may refer to:

 Bill Posey (born 1947), American businessman and politician; U.S. Representative from Florida
 Willie Bernard Posey (died 2006), bodyguard of football player Tank Johnson
 William Posey Silva (1859–1948), American painter